Sobin Yamada is the 26th abbot of Shinju-an, a subtemple of the important Rinzai Zen temple of Daitoku-ji in Kyoto. Shinju-an is the memorial temple for Ikkyu. Yamada studied at Hanazono, a Rinzai university in Kyoto, and at Ryukoku University.

Bibliography
 Unraveling Zen's Red Thread: Ikkyu's Controversial Way, Dr. Jon[etta] Carter Covell and Abbot Sobin Yamada, 1980, HollyM International, Elizabeth, New Jersey, .
 Zen at Daitoku-ji, with Dr. Jon Carter Covell.

See also
Buddhism in Japan
List of Rinzai Buddhists

Zen Buddhist abbots
Rinzai Buddhists
Japanese Zen Buddhists
Living people
Year of birth missing (living people)